Sigurd Slåttebrekk (born 6 January 1968) is a Norwegian classical pianist.

Born in Stavanger, Norway, Slåttebrekk is acclaimed for his recordings of works by Maurice Ravel and Robert Schumann. He received his earliest piano training from his mother, Karin Slåttebrekk, and Ingeborg Songe-Møller. He continued his studies under Einar Steen-Nøkleberg at the Norwegian Academy of Music and Jerome Lowenthal at the Juilliard School and with Lazar Berman.

In 1997, he decided to stop giving concerts, but after a hiatus of seven years, he made his comeback at the Oslo Chamber Music Festival in August 2002.

External links
Review of Schumann recording by John Bell Young
Review of Grieg's A-minor recording by David Hurwitz

1968 births
Living people
Musicians from Stavanger
Norwegian classical pianists
21st-century classical pianists